Adrian Mark Owen  (born 17 May 1966) is a British neuroscientist and best-selling author. He is best known for his 2006 discovery, published in the journal Science, showing that some patients thought to be in a persistent vegetative state are in fact fully aware and (shown subsequently) able to communicate with the outside world using functional magnetic resonance imaging (fMRI). In the 2019 New Year Honours List, Owen was made an Officer of the Most Excellent Order of the British Empire (OBE) for services to scientific research.

Early life and education
Adrian Owen was born 17 May 1966 in Gravesend, England, and educated at Gravesend Grammar School, graduating in the same final year class as actor Paul Ritter. His first degree was in Psychology from University College London 1985–1988. As a student he shared accommodation with Psychologist and best-selling author Richard Wiseman. Owen completed his PhD at the Institute of Psychiatry, London (now part of King's College London) between 1988 and 1992.

Career
In 1992, Owen began his post-doctoral research in the Cognitive Neuroscience Unit at the Montreal Neurological Institute, McGill University, working with Michael Petrides and Brenda Milner. He was awarded The Pinsent Darwin Scholarship by the University of Cambridge in 1996 and returned to the UK to work at the newly opened Wolfson Brain Imaging Centre, Cambridge. In 1997 he moved to the Medical Research Council's Cognition and Brain Sciences Unit (CBU), Cambridge (formally the Applied Psychology Unit) to set up the neuroimaging programme there and to pursue his research in cognitive neuroscience. He was awarded MRC tenure in 2000 and made Assistant Director of the MRC CBU in 2005, with overall responsibility for the onsite imaging facilities (3T Siemens Tim Trio MRI and 306-channel Elekta-Neuromag MEG systems).

In 2010, Owen was awarded a $10M Canada Excellence Research Chair in Cognitive Neuroscience and Imaging at The University of Western Ontario (UWO) and moved most of his research team to Canada in order to take up this position in January 2011.

In October 2019 Owen was the guest for the BBC Radio 4 programme The Life Scientific.

Research
Over the last 30 years, Owen has published more than 300 peer-reviewed scientific papers and over 40 chapters and books. His work has appeared in many of the world's most prestigious scientific and medical journals, including Science, Nature, The Lancet and The New England Journal of Medicine. He has an h-Index of 112 according to Google Scholar.

His early publications on patients with frontal or temporal-lobe excisions pioneered the use of touch screen based computerised cognitive tests in neuropsychology. Over the last 30 years, these tests have gone on to be used in more than 600 published studies of Parkinson's disease, Alzheimer's disease, Huntington's disease, Depression, Schizophrenia, Autism, Obsessive-Compulsive Disorder and ADHD, among others.

His post-doctoral research on working memory with Michael Petrides, (PNAS, Cerebral Cortex, Journal of Cognitive Neuroscience, Brain and others) was instrumental in refuting the then prevailing view of lateral frontal-lobe organisation advanced by Patricia Goldman-Rakic and others, and is still widely cited in that context. His 1996 paper on the organisation of working memory processes within the human frontal lobe continues to be one of the most highly cited articles ever to appear in the scientific journal Cerebral Cortex.

His 2006 paper in the journal Science demonstrated for the first time that functional neuroimaging could be used to detect awareness in patients who are incapable of generating any recognised behavioural response and appear to be in a vegetative state. This landmark discovery has had implications for clinical care, diagnosis, medical ethics and medical/legal decision-making (relating to the prolongation, or otherwise, of life after severe brain injury). In a follow up paper in 2010 in The New England Journal of Medicine, Owen and his team used a similar method to allow a man believed to be in a vegetative state for more than 5 years to answer 'yes' and 'no' questions with responses that were generated solely by changing his brain activity using fMRI.

This research attracted international attention from the world's media; it was reported in many hundreds of newspapers around the world (including twice on the front page of The New York Times'' and other quality journals) and has been widely discussed on television (e.g. BBC News, Channel 4 News, ITN News, Sky News, CNN), radio (e.g. BBC World Service) 'Outlook' documentary, NPR Radio (USA), BBC Radio 1, 2, 3 and 4), in print (e.g. full featured articles in The New Yorker The Times, The Sunday Times, The Observer Magazine etc.) and online (including Nature, Science and The Guardian podcasts). To date, the discovery has featured prominently in 6 television documentaries including 60 Minutes (USA), Panorama BBC Special Report (UK), Inside Out (BBC TV series) (UK), and CBC The National (Canada).

In 2009, Owen launched Cambridge Brain Sciences, a web-based platform for healthcare providers and the wider scientific community to assess cognitive function using scientifically proven tests of memory, attention, reasoning and planning. To date, the tests on the site have been taken more than 12 million times by people worldwide.

In April 2010, Owen and his team published the largest ever public test of computer-based brain training in the journal Nature. The study, conducted in conjunction with the BBC, showed that practice on brain training games does not transfer to other mental skills. More than 11,000 adults followed a six-week training regime, completing computer-based tasks on the BBC's website designed to improve reasoning, memory, planning, visuospatial skills and attention. Details of the results were revealed on BBC1 in Can You Train Your Brain?, a Bang Goes the Theory special and published on the same day in Nature.

In November 2011, Owen led a study that was published in a weekly peer-reviewed medical journal, The Lancet. The Researchers found a method for assessing whether or not some patients who appear to be vegetative, are in fact, conscious and are just not able to respond. This new method is using electroencephalography (EEG), which is not only less expensive than MRI, but is also portable and can be taken right to the patients bedside for testing.

Book
In June 2017, Owen published 'Into The Gray Zone: A Neuroscientist Explores the Border Between Life and Death' a popular science book that told the story of his 20-year quest to show that some patients thought to be in a vegetative state were in fact entirely aware, but incapable of indicating their awareness to the outside world. The book became a best-seller on both sides of the Atlantic and received strong positive reviews from publications  including Nature, The Guardian, and The New York Times. The book made Sunday Times 'Book of The Year', and The Times 'Book of The Week', it was listed on The New Yorker list 'What We're Reading This Summer' and received 4.9 out of 5 stars on Amazon. The book was translated into multiple languages, including Italian, French, Russian, German, Taiwanese, Japanese, Czech and Polish.

Other academic roles
Owen served as Deputy Editor-in-Chief of the European Journal of Neuroscience from 1997 to 2005 and as an Associate Editor of the Journal of Neuroscience from 2006 to 2012. He was a member of the Neurosciences and Mental Health Committee of the Wellcome Trust in the UK from 2007 to 2012, and of the Gairdner Medical Review Panel in Canada from 2012 to 2017. Since 2007, 2012, and 2014, respectively, he has served on the advisory Board of the Annals of the New York Academy of Sciences, as a member of the Wellcome Trust Peer Review Panel, and as a member of the Peer Review Committee for the Canadian Institutes of Health Research.

Owen has also held or holds affiliations with several universities and committees on neuroscience, neuroethics, psychiatry, and philosophy, including the Institute of Psychiatry, Robarts Research Institute, and the International Scientific Committee for the Institute of Cognitive Neurology (INECO).

Personal life
Owen lives in London, Ontario and has one son, Jackson. His brother, Christopher J. Owen, is Professor of Physics and Head of the Space Plasma Group at University College London (UCL) Department of Space and Climate Physics. His sister, Frances Walsh is Safeguarding Nurse for the NHS, in Warwickshire, England.

For the past twenty-years, Owen has played guitar and sung in various bands made up of fellow scientists and musicians.

References

External links
 Adrian Owen's Lab web page.
 CERC - Canada Excellence Research Chair
 Cambridge Brain Sciences, online web-based testing.
 Clare Hall, Cambridge.
 BBC News coverage of Adrian Owen's research.
 BBC News coverage of Adrian Owen's research.
 Brain Test Britain (Bang Goes The Theory).
 Adrian Owen's recent collaboration with The New Scientist.
 BBC Panorama Documentary "The Mind Reader: Unlocking My Voice".

Living people
Alumni of King's College London
1966 births
Alumni of the University of Cambridge
Officers of the Order of the British Empire
People from Gravesend, Kent
Canada Research Chairs
Academics of the University of Cambridge
Academic staff of the University of Western Ontario
People educated at Gravesend Grammar School
Alumni of University College London
British cognitive neuroscientists